Matimba Power Station close to Ellisras, Limpopo Province, South Africa, is a dry-cooled coal-fired power plant operated by Eskom.

Power generation
The station consists of six 665 MW units with a total installed capacity of 3,990 MW. Turbine Maximum Continuous Rating is 35.60%. The power station was commissioned between 1988 and 1993.  Matimba is the largest direct dry-cooled power station in the world. The use of dry-cooling technology has considerably reduced water consumption at the plant relative to those using wet-cooling systems.

Matimba is fueled by the open cast Grootegeluk coal mine on the Waterberg Coalfield with about 14.6 million tons of coal a year via a conveyor system. The mine is also contracted to supply the new Medupi Power Station.

See also 

 Eskom
 Fossil-fuel power plant
 List of power stations in South Africa

References

External links
 Matimba Power Station on the Eskom-Website

 

Coal-fired power stations in South Africa
Towers in South Africa
Economy of Limpopo